The CMLL Universal Championship 2009 (Campeonato Universal in Spanish) was a professional wrestling annual tournament produced by Consejo Mundial de Lucha Libre (CMLL) that took place over three CMLL Super Viernes shows between June 5, 2009 and June 19, 2009 in Arena México, Mexico City, Mexico. The CMLL Universal Championship is an annual tournament of CMLL Champions that was first held in 2009. All officially recognized male CMLL Champions participated in a 15-match single elimination tournament. In the final CMLL World Heavyweight Champion Último Guerrero defeated NWA World Light Heavyweight Champion El Texano Jr. to become the first CMLL Universal Champion.

Background
The tournament featured 15 professional wrestling matches under single elimination rules, which means that wrestlers were eliminated when they lose a match. There were no specific storylines that build to the tournament, rather it was a replacement for CMLL's annual Leyenda de Plata that CMLL last held in 2008. All male "non-regional" CMLL Champions at the time of the tournament were involved in the tournament with the exception of the reigning CMLL World Mini-Estrella and Mexican National Lightweight Champions. CMLL promoted championships such as the regional CMLL Arena Coliseo Tag Team Championship or the Occidente championships promoted in Guadalajara, Jalisco were not included in the tournament, only titles that have been defended in CMLL's main venue Arena Mexico were included. The tournament was divided into two qualifying blocks, which took place on the June 5, 2009 Super Viernes and the June 12, 2009 Super Viernes while the finals was the main event of the June 19, 2009 Super Viernes.

2009 Universal Championship tournament

Block A

Block A competed on the June 5, 2009 Super Viernes with the winner advancing to the finals on June 19, 2009. Champions in the first round were.

Block A

Block B

Block B competed on the June 12, 2009 Super Viernes with the winner advancing to the finals on June 19, 2009. Champions in the first round were.

Block B

Finals
The finals was contested under "best two out of three falls" rules and was the main event of the June 19, 2009 Super Viernes show. Último Guerrero defeated El Texano Jr. two falls to one to become the first ever Universal Champion.

Aftermath
Like its predecessor the Leyenda de Plata tournament, the Universal Championship tournament trophy (in this case an actual championship belt) was not defended in the following year.

References

2009 in professional wrestling
CMLL Universal Championship